USS Courlan is a name used more than once by the U.S. Navy:

 , a coastal minesweeper which served in an "in service" status from 1941 to 1947.
 YMS-114 was reclassified and named  on 1 September 1947.

References 
 

United States Navy ship names